The United States' Serena Williams and Venus Williams defeated Spain's Anabel Medina Garrigues and Virginia Ruano Pascual in the final, 6–2, 6–0 to win the gold medal in Women's Doubles tennis at the 2008 Summer Olympics. In the bronze medal match, China's Yan Zi and Zheng Jie defeated Ukraine's Alona Bondarenko and Kateryna Bondarenko, 6–2, 6–2. This was the Williams sisters' second Olympic gold medal in Women's Doubles.

The tournament was held from 10 August to 17 August at the Olympic Green Tennis Centre in Beijing, China. The DecoTurf surface rendered the event a hardcourt tournament.

China's Li Ting and Sun Tiantian were the reigning gold medalists, but Li retired from tennis in 2007. Sun partnered with Peng Shuai, but they were defeated in the first round by Belarus' Olga Govortsova and Darya Kustova.

Medalists

Calendar

Seeds

Draw

Key

 INV = Tripartite Invitation
 IP = ITF place
 ALT = Alternate

 r = Retired
 w/o = Walkover

Finals

Top half

Bottom half

External links 
Draw

2008
Women's Doubles
2008 in women's tennis
Women's events at the 2008 Summer Olympics